Garden City is a city in southeast Cass County, Missouri,  United States. The population was 1,642 at the 2010 census. The city lies within the Kansas City metropolitan area.

History
Garden City was platted in 1885, and so named on account of the fertile soil near the town site. A post office called Garden City has been in operation since 1875.

The O'Bannon Homestead was listed on the National Register of Historic Places in 1979.

Geography
Garden City is located along Missouri Route 35. The headwaters of Panther Creek arise just southeast of the location.

Demographics

2020 census 
As of the census of 2020, the population was 1,629 people, with the median age being 36.5 and a median household income of $55,150. Between 2019 and 2020 the population of Garden City, MO grew from 1,345 to 1,506, a 12% increase. White (non-Hispanic) is the largest ethnic group in the city with a percentage of 86.3. In 2020, there were 9.29 times more White (Non-Hispanic) residents (1.3k people) in Garden City, MO than any other race or ethnicity. None of the households in Garden City, MO reported speaking a non-English language at home as their primary shared language. In 2020, the median property value in Garden City, MO was $114,100, and the homeownership rate was 67.3%. Most people in Garden City, MO drove alone to work, and the average commute time was 31.5 minutes. The average car ownership in Garden City, MO was 2 cars per household.

2010 census
As of the census of 2010, there were 1,642 people, 650 households, and 436 families residing in the city. The racial makeup of the city was 97.4% White, 0.2% African American, 0.9% Native American, 0.2% Asian, 0.4% from other races, and 0.9% from two or more races. Hispanic or Latino of any race were 1.7% of the population.

There were 650 households, of which 38.6% had children under the age of 18 living with them, 48.8% were married couples living together, 12.5% had a female householder with no husband present, 5.8% had a male householder with no wife present, and 32.9% were non-families. 27.4% of all households were made up of individuals, and 8.8% had someone living alone who was 65 years of age or older. The average household size was 2.53 and the average family size was 3.06.

The median age in the city was 33.1 years. 29.2% of residents were under the age of 18; 8.3% were between the ages of 18 and 24; 27.5% were from 25 to 44; 23.9% were from 45 to 64; and 11.2% were 65 years of age or older. The gender makeup of the city was 49.3% male and 50.7% female.

2000 census
As of the census of 2000, there were 1,500 people, 595 households, and 399 families residing in the city. The population density was 869.0 people per square mile (334.8/km2). There were 630 housing units at an average density of 365.0 per square mile (140.6/km2). The racial makeup of the city was 97.73% White, 0.20% African American, 0.47% Native American, 0.33% from other races, and 1.27% from two or more races. Hispanic or Latino of any race were 1.47% of the population.

There were 595 households, out of which 35.5% had children under the age of 18 living with them, 53.3% were married couples living together, 10.3% had a female householder with no husband present, and 32.8% were non-families. 27.7% of all households were made up of individuals, and 13.4% had someone living alone who was 65 years of age or older. The average household size was 2.52 and the average family size was 3.11.

In the city the population was spread out, with 29.1% under the age of 18, 10.1% from 18 to 24, 30.3% from 25 to 44, 18.5% from 45 to 64, and 11.9% who were 65 years of age or older. The median age was 32 years. For every 100 females, there were 93.1 males. For every 100 females age 18 and over, there were 86.8 males.

The median income for a household in the city was $37,461, and the median income for a family was $43,125. Males had a median income of $31,848 versus $20,486 for females. The per capita income for the city was $19,695. About 7.7% of families and 8.0% of the population were below the poverty line, including 7.7% of those under age 18 and 7.1% of those age 65 or over.

Education
Public education in Garden City is administered by the Sherwood Cass R-VIII School District, which operates one elementary school, one middle school, and Sherwood High School.

Garden City has a public library, a branch of the Cass County Public Library.

Garden City Fire Protection District 
The Garden City Fire Protection District was founded and chartered by the residents of the district and State of Missouri in 1972 after the fire service had been provided by a fire association since the 1800s.  The fire district was an all volunteer department until July 2001 when it hired its first full-time employee.

The GCFPD protects more than 94 square miles of land.  The district is currently protected by two fire stations, located at 300 Main Street, in Garden City. Station 2 located in Dayton, MO

Currently, the Department employs 15 part-time personnel and has 15 volunteer personnel. The Department is staffed 24 hours per day and operates an EMS unit that is cross staffed to operate fire apparatus. GCFPD has numerous apparatus, a 2016 and 2017 EMS unit (EMS 95 & 96), a 2018 Spartan Engine (E96) and a two-seat engine (E92), a 2006 3000 gallon Tanker (T97), a 1996 Ford Brush unit and a 2017 Ford Brush unit (B96 and B91). Brush 96 and Engine 92 are located at station 2.

Finally, the Fire District's fire insurance rating is presently a Class 6 within the city limits. Outside the city limits  (without hydrants) it is a Class 9.

Notable people
 Tyler Farr - Country music singer-songwriter
 Ewing Kauffman - Businessman who founded Marion Laboratories and the first owner of the Kansas City Royals

References

External links
 Historic maps of Garden City in the Sanborn Maps of Missouri Collection at the University of Missouri
 Garden City, Missouri Official Website

Cities in Cass County, Missouri
Cities in Missouri